This is a record of El Salvador's results at the FIFA World Cup. The FIFA World Cup, sometimes called the Football World Cup or the Soccer World Cup, but usually referred to simply as the World Cup, is an international association football competition contested by the men's national teams of the members of Fédération Internationale de Football Association (FIFA), the sport's global governing body. The championship has been awarded every four years since the first tournament in 1930, except in 1942 and 1946, due to World War II.

The tournament consists of two parts, the qualification phase and the final phase (officially called the World Cup Finals). The qualification phase, which currently take place over the three years preceding the Finals, is used to determine which teams qualify for the Finals. The current format of the Finals involves 32 teams competing for the title, at venues within the host nation (or nations) over a period of about a month. The World Cup Finals is the most widely viewed sporting event in the world, with an estimated 715.1 million people watching the 2006 tournament final.

Record at the FIFA World Cup

*Draws include knockout matches decided via penalty shoot-out

By match

Record by opponent

Matches

1970 Mexico

Group 1

1982 Spain

Group 3

Record players
Sixteen players have been fielded three times each for El Salvador, making them record World Cup players for their country.

Goalscorers
El Salvador's only FIFA World cup goal was scored in one of the biggest-ever defeats in World Cup history, their 1–10 loss against Hungary in 1982. The goalscorer was Luis Ramírez Zapata, who scored from close range to make it 1–5 in the match.

Previous squads

References

 
Countries at the FIFA World Cup
World Cup